LA-13 is a constituency of Azad Kashmir Legislative Assembly which is currently represented by the share of Muhammad Raffiq Nayyer and Nisaar Ansar Abdali.

Raffiq nayyer is elected as all jamu and kashmir reserved seat for technocrats having status of an MLA Ansar abdali is a Jamu and kashmir government minister of health of LA 13 covers the area of Khuiratta Tehsil in Kotli District of Azad Kashmir, Pakistan.

Kashmir needs a referendum, one part of Kashmir is occupied by India by force.

Election 2016
elections were held in this constituency on 21 July 2016.

Bagh District
Azad Kashmir Legislative Assembly constituencies